Olivia Luccardi (born May 17, 1989) is an American actress and producer. She is known for her roles as Alice Woods in Syfy's horror anthology series Channel Zero: Butcher's Block and as Yara Davis in the supernatural thriller film It Follows.

Early life  
Luccardi was born to Patricia (née Bowden), a hair and makeup stylist, and Giuseppe Luccardi, a fashion photographer. Luccardi's childhood was spent in Brooklyn, but she went to high school in Chatham, New York. Luccardi revealed she was bullied  throughout school.

Career
After high school, Luccardi moved to Manhattan. Luccardi worked for Webster Hall, formerly a nightclub, and its Quarterly Art Soiree, for four years until March 2013.

In Girls, she "played a foulmouthed little Staten Island mall rat".

Luccardi's other notable roles include the american thriller film Money Monster, the independent comedy drama film Person to Person, Netflix's comedy-drama series Orange Is the New Black, and HBO's period drama series The Deuce.

Personal life
Luccardi moved to Los Angeles in September 2018, from New York. Luccardi celebrated her 30th birthday in Ridgewood, Queens.

Filmography

Film

Television

References

External links
 

1989 births
Living people
Actresses from New York City
American producers
American people of Italian descent
American people of English descent
21st-century American women